Devki is a Marathi movie released on 10 December 2001. The movie has been directed by Milind Ukey and produced by Mayur Shah as well as Naushir Misstry.

Cast 
The cast includes Alka Athalye, Sudhir Joshi, Dr Girish Oak, Shilpa Tulaskar, Milind Gawali & others.

References

External links
  Interview Milind Gawali - indianexpress.com
  Milind Gawli Official Website- www.milindgawali.com
  Official Trailer - videophobia.com

2001 films
2000s Marathi-language films
Films scored by Lalit Sen